René Luís Vilela Squella Rivas, or Rene Playboy is a retired Brazilian football (soccer) player who spent his career in the United States and Portuguese lower divisions.

In 1993, Rivas joined S.C. Campomaiorense in Portugal.  After two seasons, he moved to the United States and signed with the Rochester Raging Rhinos of the A-League.  He was 1996 First Team All A-League.  During the 1997 season, he left the Rhinos and signed with S.C. Campomaiorense.  He began the 1999-2000 season with Compaomaiorense, but moved to C.D. Santa Clara during the winter transfer window.  He then moved to Leça F.C. for the 2000-2001 season, S.C. Vila Real for the 2001-2002 season and Imortal Desportivo Clube for the 2002-2003 season.  In July 2003, Rivas went on loan to the Syracuse Salty Dogs of the A-League.  Imortal then sold his contract to Syracuse and Rivas remained with the Salty Dogs through the 2004 season.  In 2005, Rivas returned to the Rhinos.  He retired at the end of the season.

References

External links
 Portuguese stats

Living people
1968 births
American Professional Soccer League players
Brazilian footballers
Brazilian expatriate footballers
Leça F.C. players
S.C. Campomaiorense players
Rochester New York FC players
C.D. Santa Clara players
Syracuse Salty Dogs players
Imortal D.C. players
Association football defenders
Association football midfielders
Footballers from Rio de Janeiro (city)